This article covers cricket broadcasting rights. For a list of sports broadcasting rights by countries, see list of sports television broadcast contracts.

In certain countries international cricket rights are protected and must be broadcast live and free-to-air.

Protected TV rights
In India the content rights holder is required to share the feed with national broadcaster Doordarshan for "Sports events of National importance". Doordarshan can broadcast the game only on terrestrial TV and its own direct to home platform. They are not permitted to share these signals with cable operators and other DTH providers. As of 2017 all official one-day international, Twenty20 and test matches played by the Indian men's cricket team, semifinals and finals of the men's World Cup and International Cricket Council Championship Trophy are considered as cricketing events of “national importance”.

In Australia an anti-siphoning list gives the free-to-air broadcasters the first right to negotiate. For cricket, it includes all Test matches Australia plays at home or in England, home ODIs and home T20 internationals. It also includes Australia's matches in the World Cup or World T20 when played at home, and the final of any tournament hosted in Australia or New Zealand.

In UK Test matches involving the English national team and world cup matches involving home nations as well as semi-finals and finals are included in the category B list of the Ofcom Code on Sports and Other Listed and Designated Events. Category B events are allowed to be broadcast on pay TV provided there is adequate secondary coverage in the form of highlights and delayed broadcasts.

Primary rights sale
Various cricket boards and the ICC often sell the rights first to a primary broadcaster who may later resell those rights to other streaming or broadcast partners in territories where the original broadcaster has no presence. For example, Sta seen Sports bought the global rights for IPL in all territories and all platforms from BCCI and later resold these rights to Sky Sports for the UK market.

References

Cricket on television
Lists of cricket broadcasters